(S)-1-phenylethanol dehydrogenase (PED) is an enzyme with systematic name (S)-1-phenylethanol:NAD+ oxidoreductase. This enzyme catalyses the following chemical reaction

 (S)-1-phenylethanol + NAD+  acetophenone + NADH + H+

The enzyme is involved in degradation of ethylbenzene.

References

External links 
 

EC 1.1.1